The seventh series of Warsaw Shore, a Polish television programme based in Warsaw, Poland was announced on 20 January 2017. The seventh season began airing on 26 February 2017. This was the first series not to include Aleksandra Smoleń, who left the show at the end of the previous series. On 14 February 2017 it was announced that three former cast members Alan Kwieciński, Ewelina Kubiak and Klaudia Stec returned to the show. Ahead of the series it was confirmed that the series would be filmed in Zakopane.

Cast
Alan Kwieciński
Damian Zduńczyk
Ewelina Kubiak
Jakub Henke
Klaudia Stec
Magda Pyznar
Anna "Mała" Aleksandrzak (Episodes 1–10)
Ewelina "Młoda" Bańkowska
Piotr Polak
Wojciech Gola

Duration of cast

Notes 

 Key:  = "Cast member" is featured in this episode.
 Key:  = "Cast member" arrives in the house.
 Key:  = "Cast member" voluntarily leaves the house.
 Key:  = "Cast member" leaves and returns to the house in the same episode.
 Key:  = "Cast member" returns to the house.
 Key:  = "Cast member" leaves the series.
 Key:  = "Cast member" returns to the series.
 Key:  = "Cast member" does not feature in this episode.
 Key:  = "Cast member" is not officially a cast member in this episode.

Episodes

References 

2017 Polish television seasons
Series 7